BIN is a Japanese music group consisting of three members: yama (vocalist), tomato (illustrator), and T (producer). They are signed to the record label Pony Canyon.

Overview  

On March 16, 2019, the group appeared on the internet music scene with the release of the MV for their first single「チルドレン」(Children) on YouTube. On February 10, 2020, the single「灰」(Ash) was released exclusively on CD for Tower Records.  It has five songs. In November of the same year it was chosen as one of four groups that Tower Records was promoting for a month under their project タワレコメン (Tawarekomen), which is a portmanteau of the words タワー (tower) and レコメンド (recommend). On March 24, 2021, their first album "COLONY" was released.

Discography

Streaming/download singles

CD single

Full Album

See also 
yama

External links  
Pony Canyon Artist Page

References

Japanese musical trios
Pony Canyon artists
Musical groups established in 2020
2020 establishments in Japan